Benjamin Clark Hilliard (January 9, 1868 – August 7, 1951) was an American lawyer, jurist, and politician. He served two terms as a U.S. Representative from Colorado, and was a two-time chief justice of the Supreme Court of Colorado.

Early life and education
Albert George Hilliard who was a farmer and served as private in the 37th Illinois Infantry Regiment under Colonel John C. Black. He was severely wounded during the war, and carried bullets within his body and his right eye was destroyed.

His mother, Euphema Ellen Clark, was an educated and cultured woman who died in 1881. At the time of her death, Hilliard had two siblings. His father remarried and moved to Kansas, where he died due to accidental drowning in 1906.

Hilliard attended the public schools of Iowa and Kansas. He taught school in Kansas. He graduated from the University of Iowa College of Law in 1891.

Career
He was admitted to the bar in Iowa in 1891 and in Missouri in 1892. He commenced practice in Kansas City, Missouri. He moved to Denver, Colorado in 1893 and was admitted to the bar in Colorado that year. He served as city attorney of Highlands, Colorado in 1896 and 1897, as county attorney of Elbert County, Colorado from 1897 to 1907, and as county attorney of Grand County, Colorado 1909-1913.

Initially a Republican, Hilliard joined the Democratic party in 1902. He served as member of the Colorado House of Representatives in 1902. He served as member of the Denver Board of Education 1900-1902 from 1904 to 1909, and 1913-1917. Hilliard was elected as a Democrat to the Sixty-fourth and Sixty-fifth Congresses (March 4, 1915 – March 3, 1919). On April 5, 1917, he voted against declaring war on Germany.  He was not a candidate for renomination in 1918.

He resumed the practice of law. Hilliard was elected justice of the Supreme Court of Colorado in 1930 and served as chief justice in 1939, 1940, 1944, 1949 and 1950. Due to his many minority opinions, he was frequently called the state's "great dissenter".

He was a member of the Denver Civic and Commercial Association and the Denver and Colorado bar associations. He was active in the local Masonic Temple and his church.

Personal life
On May 22, 1889, Hilliard married Tida Zimmerman in Carroll County, Missouri. Her parents, John and Dora Zimmerman, were wealthy farmers and provided a good education for their daughter, Tida. They had four children, two sons and two daughters. Both of his sons became lawyers. His wife died in 1946.

He had a heart attack on August 1, 1951 and was taken to St. Luke's Hospital. He died in Denver, Colorado, August 7, 1951.  He was interred in Crown Hill Cemetery.

Notes

References

External links

 
 

1868 births
1951 deaths
Justices of the Colorado Supreme Court
District attorneys in Colorado
School board members in Colorado
Democratic Party members of the United States House of Representatives from Colorado
People from Clarke County, Iowa
University of Iowa College of Law alumni
Democratic Party members of the Colorado House of Representatives
Chief Justices of the Colorado Supreme Court